Feel It Now may refer to:

"Feel It Now", song from the Now United discography
"Feel It Now", song by The Fountainhead (band) also featured on the Self Aid album
"Feel It Now", song by Tonic from Tonic
"Feel It Now", song by Fang Wu
"Feel It Now", song by Black Rebel Motorcycle Club from Howl